Rolf Gomes is an Australian cardiologist. He founded Heart of Australia, an organisation that delivers specialist medical services (currently cardiac and respiratory health) to people in rural Queensland using large trucks to carry the diagnostic and treatment equipment normally only available in cities.

References 

Australian cardiologists
Living people
Year of birth missing (living people)